The 1948–49 American International Aces men's ice hockey season was the inaugural season of play for the program. The Aces represented American International College and were coached by William Turner, who also served as team captain.

Season
AIC's first ice hockey team was organized and arranged at the behest of senior William Turner. The club was able to not only secure seven opponents for the season but managed to also use the Big E Coliseum for their home games rather than have to rely on frozen ponds. The Aces played well in their first season, finishing with a winning record. More impressive, however, was that fact that their three losses on the year were to two of the strongest teams in college hockey, BU and eventual National Champion, BC.

Dick Kearns served as team manager with Ray Guilmentte as his assistant.

Roster

Standings

Schedule and results

|-
!colspan=12 style=";" | Regular season

† BU does not record a game against AIC during the season.‡ Suffolk's varsity records only go back to 1980. It's possible this game was against a club team.

References

1948–49
American International
American International
American International